Titus Genucius Augurinus was a Roman politician in the 5th century BC, consul and decemvir in 451 BC.

Family
He was a member of the gens Genucii. He was the son of Lucius and grandson of Lucius. His complete name is Titus Genucius L.f. L.n. Augurinus. He was the brother of Marcus Genucius Augurinus, consul in 445 BC. The importance of the Genucii Augurini among the patricians of the time is uncertain. His nomen is sometimes given under the form Minucius.

Biography
In 451 BC, he was elected consul with Appius Claudius Crassus. They put in place the first Decemvirate with Crassus presiding. Augurinus held the offices of decemvir and consul simultaneously. The decemviri wrote up the first ten tables of the Twelve Tables.

References

Bibliography

Ancient bibliography
 Livy, Ab urbe condita
  Diodorus Siculus, Universal History,  Book XII, 9 on the site Philippe Remacle
 Dionysius of Halicarnassus, Roman Antiquities

Modern bibliography
 

5th-century BC Roman consuls
Ancient Roman decemvirs
Augurinus, Titus
449 BC deaths
Year of birth unknown